Operation Cat Drop is the name given to the delivery of some 14,000 cats by the United Kingdom's Royal Air Force to remote regions of the then-British colony of Sarawak (today part of Malaysia), on the island of Borneo in 1960. The cats were flown out of Singapore and delivered in crates dropped by parachutes as part of a broader program of supplying cats to combat a plague of rats. The operation was reported as a "success" at the time. Some newspaper reports published soon after the Operation reference only 23 cats being used. However, later reports state as many as 14,000 cats were used. An additional source references a "recruitment" drive for 30 cats a few days prior to Operation Cat Drop.

Background
The native domestic cat population had been reduced as an unintended consequence of the World Health Organization (WHO) spraying the insecticide dichlorodiphenyltrichloroethane (DDT) for malaria and housefly control. This event is often referenced as a example of the problems and solutions that may arise from human interventions in the environment, or of how unintended consequences lead to other events more generally, and particularly how frameworks such as systems thinking or "whole systems thinking" can more effectively forecast and avoid negative consequences.

Operation Cat Drop was initiated to stop a plague of rats which was the result of tens of thousands of cats dying from eating lizards that contained high concentrations of DDT. The lizards became feeble due to the DDT in their systems which rendered them easy prey. The domino effect started by the application of DDT is stated in a National Institutes of Health article: One source questions whether the cats died only from DDT or from additional insecticides in the food chain such as dieldrin. Dieldrin was used in Sarawak only during 1955 and, due to its higher level of toxicity, was discontinued. DDT was sprayed from 1953 until 1955.  Additionally, there are multiple reports of cat deaths in other DDT spray locations such as Bolivia, Mexico, and Thailand as a result of cats ingesting lethal levels of this neurotoxin. In several of these cases, the cat fatalities were the result of cats licking their fur after brushing up against a wall or other surface sprayed with DDT.

Similar projects
There have been various other projects involving delivering animals by parachute. Video footage purporting to show an aerial beaver drop, intended to improve water quality, appeared in October 2015. Utah Division of Wildlife Resources restocks its 'high-elevation lakes and streams with tiny trout' dropped directly (no parachute) from an aircraft flying 100–150 feet above the water.

See also
Beaver drop

References

External links
 Catdrop.com: a site prepared by Patrick T. O’Shaughnessy, an associate professor at the University of Iowa 
 Systems Thinking: Operation Cat Drop and Chaotic Kindness
  
 flycatfly.com
 http://theindependent.sg/singapores-operation-cat-drop-which-saved-sarawakians-from-possible-disaster/
 M.J. Colbourne, W H Huehne, F de S LaChance, “The Sarawak Anti-Malaria Project,” Sarawak Museum Journal 9 (1960): 215–248

History of Sarawak
1960 in Malaya
Biological pest control
Cats
Parachuting